Hiperantha is a genus of beetles in the family Buprestidae, tribe Stigmoderini, containing the following species:

 Hiperantha bella Saunders, 1869
 Hiperantha boyi Thery, 1936
 Hiperantha decorata (Gory, 1841)
 Hiperantha fontainieri Thery, 1928
 Hiperantha hoscheki Thery, 1943
 Hiperantha interrogationis (Klug, 1825)
 Hiperantha langsdorffii (Klug, 1825)
 Hiperantha menetriesii Mannerheim, 1837
 Hiperantha pallida Obenberger, 1922
 Hiperantha pilifrons Kerremans, 1903
 Hiperantha quadrisignata Hoscheck, 1928
 Hiperantha sallei Rojas, 1855
 Hiperantha sanguinosa Mannerheim, 1837
 Hiperantha saundersi Thery, 1928
 Hiperantha speculigera (Perty, 1830)
 Hiperantha stempelmanni Berg, 1889
 Hiperantha stigmaticollis Desmarest, 1843
 Hiperantha terminalis (Gory & Laporte, 1839)
 Hiperantha testacea (Fabricius, 1801)
 Hiperantha theryi Hoscheck, 1928
 Hiperantha vittaticollis Desmarest, 1843

References

Buprestidae genera